Tarik Darreh is a village in Gilan Province, Iran.

Tarik Darreh may also refer to:
 Tarik Darreh-ye Bala, Hamadan Province
 Tarik Darreh-ye Pain, Hamadan Province

See also
 Darreh Tarik